The 1930 William & Mary Indians football team represented the College of William & Mary as a member of the Virginia Conference during the 1930 college football season. Led by third-year head coach Branch Bocock, the Indians compiled an overall record of 7–2–1 with a mark of 5–0 in conference play, winning the Virginia Conference title.

Schedule

References

William and Mary
William & Mary Tribe football seasons
William and Mary Indians football